Medina Lake is a reservoir on the Medina River in the Texas Hill Country of the United States.  It is operated by the Bexar/Medina/Atascosa County Agricultural District.  Medina Dam was completed in 1913 in a privately financed project, creating the lake to supply irrigation water for local agricultural use.  Lake Medina is in northeastern Medina County, and southeastern Bandera County, about 40 miles (64 km) northwest of San Antonio.

It is a crescent-shaped reservoir running west to east.  It is 18 miles (29 km) long and 3 miles (5 km) wide at its broadest point. It is contained by the Medina Dam at the lake's south end. At the time of the dam's construction, it was the largest concrete dam in the country and the fourth largest dam overall. The dam is listed on the National Register of Historic Places.

The lake is fed by and discharges back into the Medina River, and serves both recreational and irrigation uses.  Communities located along the lake are Mico, Lake Medina Shores and Lakehills.

Fish populations
Medina Lake has been stocked with species of fish intended to improve the reservoir for recreational fishing.  Fish in Medina Lake include largemouth bass, white bass, hybrid striped bass, catfish, and carp. Due to drought conditions lasting up until July 2015, recreational fish species had disappeared. Plans to restock the lake once levels reach viable levels were put in place. These plans were realized when the lake did reach these levels, which as of October 2, 2016, is 96.6% full.

Future and state of the lake
As part of the 2010–13 Southern United States drought, the lake water levels dropped below 5% capacity. Many cracks, oil drums and a Jeep are visible as a result of low water. Only one public boat ramp remains, located at Red Cove in Mico. A few showers in the Summer of 2013 helped the lake rise to 5.2%, but the dam was reopened in September as many people in the South Side of San Antonio use the lake for a water source. Many businesses have closed in the area, many residents have left and Lakehills has become somewhat of a ghost town.

Heavy rainfall in the region as of May, 2015 brought the levels above 46% capacity. At that time, Medina Lake was about 28 feet low, down from 90 feet low mere months before.

Due to heavy rains on the Medina River basin & the lake itself in May 2016, Medina Lake is 100% full and 1.5 feet above its conservation pool as of June 1, 2016.

References

Reservoirs in Texas
Bodies of water of Bandera County, Texas
Bodies of water of Medina County, Texas